is a light novel series written by Yūri Eda, with illustrations by Ishinoya. The series began on August 24, 2013 and finished with seven volumes, published by Kadokawa Shoten on November 25, 2017. The series is about Kurogo Kurusu, a boy who is obsessed with kabuki and decides to form a kabuki club at his high school. A manga adaptation by Chizu Kamiko is being serialized on Kadokawa Shoten's Young Ace since March 2017. A 12-episode anime television series adaptation by Studio Deen, (with original character designs by CLAMP) aired between April 6, 2017 and June 22, 2017.

Plot
Kurogo Kurusu, a high school boy who loves the art of kabuki, so much that it is annoying. He yearns to perform kabuki for a club, but his school doesn't have one. Kurogo decides to create his own and sets out to gather members.

Characters

The main protagonist of the series, Kurusu is an upbeat high school boy with passion for kabuki. He is simple-minded and straightforward. It is unknown what happened to his parents, since he lives with his aunt Saiko, a manga artist who is often rushing to meet deadlines, leaving Kurusu to take care of himself. He's noted to be short of height and having a baby-face. However, his love for Kabuki is unparalleled. He is the president and director of the club.

Kurusu's neighbour and best friend, who aids him in creating his kabuki club. He's good with information and can easily find potential candidates for the club or other references for whatever Kurusu needs. He's more serious than Kurusu, but fully supports him. During his early childhood he earned many awards, which in turn generated the ire and envy of his peers, causing them to bully him relentlessly until he passed out in his home from the fear. As a result he moved next to Kurusu with the two becoming close. He acts as the sound and light director of the club.

A descendant from a family of Kabuki performers. He's aware of kabuki and knows many of its customs but resents it for unknown reasons. He attempts instead to form a Rock Band, but he is tone-deaf and doesn't get along with his fellow members. Akutsu is noted to be fairly talented at Kabuki, however his deeply narcissistic personality along his recurrent need to be the center of attention are his major setbacks. He had his hair dyed red and blond until he cut it down, now having a much shorter brown-coloured hair. He has a complicated relationship with his family; his mother was the one who taught him Kabuki when he was younger, but lied about his father being a famous kabuki actor. Then in middle school, Shin heard the truth from his grandmother and his mother moved away to America, marrying another man. This incident is where Shin's hate for Kabuki stems from.

A descendant from a family of Kabuki performers. He has been practicing kabuki since he was four years old, but he still feels his performance is lacking. He greatly admires his grandfather who is a famous performer, a Living National Treasure, and aspires to be with him despite the fact his grandfather wants Jin to develop his own sense and broaden his horizons. He takes kabuki very seriously, rejecting Kurusu's proposal to join his club. He considers Kurusu's Kabuki club to be a 'joke'.

A tall and intimidating upperclassman from Kurusu's school. He is silent and usually covered in bruises causing many to believe he's a delinquent. He practiced dance for a long time and had a promising future but decided to quit it, in favour of more aggressive hobbies like bodybuilding and martial arts. It turns out however that Niwa is a rather effeminate individual with a liking towards feminine things (such as female dancing or even cooking), but his continuous growth and masculine traits made it exceedingly awkward to do so. Furthermore he went out with a friend he was interested on, who unfortunately had a boyfriend of her own and mostly saw Niwa as more of a female friend than a love interest, which caused him to force himself into a more masculine persona. However he's able to accept himself through Kurusu's encouragement. He is one of the performers in the club and also helps teach the other members dance.

An upperclassman from Kurusu's school and a member of the Drama Club. Although confused by many to be male, Kaoru is in fact a girl. Her androgynous appearance and courteous behaviour make her popular amongst other girls, even those from other schools. Kurusu tries to recruit her, much to her surprise as kabuki is usually performed by men. She eventually joins the Kabuki Club, performing there and in the Drama Club.

A student from Kurusu's school, she is Akutsu's neighbour and childhood friend. A passionate otaku, she's well renowned in the internet due to her talent in creating costumes of varying designs. She is blunt, speaks fast and is well aware of her chubby face, believing herself to be unattractive and thus "beats people" in saying it first. She's eventually recruited into the Kabuki Club as the costume designer.

Niwa's childhood friend and current classmate. She spent a year in Canada so she was unaware of the reasons that changed Niwa's personality. She joins the Kabuki Club as a helper upon Niwa's request.

A member of the Drama Club. He assists the Kabuki Club upon Kaoru's request. Although he likes drama, he feels increasingly frustrated by the Drama Club's president feminist's management, putting males in charge of lesser tasks. Becoming motivated by Kurusu's ideas he quits the Drama Club and becomes a full member of the Kabuki Club. He is later revealed to have a girlfriend.

A teacher in Kurusu's school. He serves as the "advisor" of the Kabuki Club, however he knows very little about Kabuki and mostly serves to fill in a position to allow the club's existence.

Media

Light novel
The novel series, published by Kadokawa Shoten, began with the first volume published on August 24, 2013, and ended with seven volumes on November 25, 2017.

Manga
The manga adaptation by Chizu Kamikō began serialization on Kadokawa Shoten's Young Ace on February 3, 2017.

Anime
An anime television series adaptation was announced on August 12, 2016. The anime was directed by Kazuhiro Yoneda. Studio Deen produced the animation, Yoshiko Nakamura handled series composition, Majiro adapted the original character designs by CLAMP, and Masaru Yokoyama composed the music. The anime aired from April 6, 2017 to June 22, 2017 on TBS and ran for 12 episodes. The opening theme, "Running High", is performed by Hiro Shimono. Sentai Filmworks have licensed the anime and streamed it on Amazon's Anime Strike.

Reception
Anime News Network had four editors review the first episode of the anime: Despite seeing it as a typical high school club premise, Lynzee Loveridge was optimistic about learning the art of kabuki as the show progresses from its debut episode based on the studio producing it; Jacob Chapman said that the show's "refreshing sincerity and quirky flavor" of slice-of-life could bring in viewers intrigued by the notion of knowing more about its subject matter but may have to get through subpar animation and a lack of personality to get there; Paul Jensen was enthralled by the protagonist Kurogo's passion to learn more about kabuki performances and the shift in art style when viewing them but questioned whether the show can keep that pace with further episodes. The fourth reviewer, Rebecca Silverman, felt that the slice-of-life structure the introductory episode took could hold back the potential it has with its premise, saying that it "doesn't feel like a great representation of what the show could become, even more so than other series."

References

External links
 Official Website 
 Official anime Website 
  

2013 Japanese novels
2017 manga
2017 anime television series debuts
Anime and manga based on light novels
Anime Strike
Kabuki
Kadokawa Shoten manga
Kadokawa Dwango franchises
Light novels
School life in anime and manga
Seinen manga
Sentai Filmworks
Studio Deen
TBS Television (Japan) original programming
Theatre in anime and manga